American Pride is the fourteenth studio album by American country music band Alabama, released in 1992 by RCA Nashville. It included the singles "I'm in a Hurry (And Don't Know Why)", "Take a Little Trip", "Hometown Honeymoon" and "Once Upon a Lifetime". "I'm in a Hurry" was a Number One hit for the band, while the other singles all reached the Top Five on the U.S. Billboard country charts. "Between the Two of Them" was later released as a single by Tanya Tucker from her 1994 album Fire to Fire.

Brian Mansfield of Allmusic rated the album three stars out of five, saying that it did not have any "surprises". The album was their first not to hit the Top 10 of Billboard Country Albums chart and peaked at No. 11. It ranked at No. 46 on the Billboard 200.

Track listing

AOmitted from cassette version.

Personnel 

Alabama
 Randy Owen – electric guitar, lead vocals, backing vocals (10, 11)
 Jeff Cook – electric guitar, backing vocals, lead vocals (11)
 Teddy Gentry – bass guitar, backing vocals, lead vocals (10)
 Mark Herndon – drums, percussion, backing vocals

Additional musicians
 Bill Cuomo – keyboards
 Steve Nathan – keyboards
 Carl Marsh – synth bass (2), synth strings (3), synthesizers (5, 7, 11), synth harp (8)
 John Mattick – grand piano (6)
 Josh Leo – electric guitar (1, 4, 5, 7), tremolo guitar (1), guitar solo (4, 5)
 Chris Leuzinger – acoustic guitar (1),  hi-strung guitar (1), electric guitar (10, 11)
 Bernie Leadon – acoustic guitar,  mandolin (2), banjo (4), hi-strung guitar (5), tiple (5)
 Biff Watson – acoustic guitar, hi-strung guitar (1, 5), grand piano (5), classical guitar (6, 8)
 John Willis – electric guitar, acoustic guitar (8)
 Dan Toler – guitar solo (7)
 Richard Bennett – acoustic guitar (10, 11)
 Larry Hanson – acoustic guitar (10, 11)
 Craig Krampf – drums, percussion
 Sam Bush – fiddle (2)
 Bob Mason – cello (8)
 Jim Grosjean – viola (8)
 Conni Ellisor – violin (8), string arrangements (8)
 Ted Madsen – violin (8)
 "Raoul" – tick-tock (5)

Production
 Alabama – producers
 Larry Michael Lee – producer 
 Josh Leo – producer 
 Jay Messina – recording 
 Steve Marcantonio – mixing 
 Jeff Giedt – recording assistant, mix assistant 
 Denny Purcell – mastering at Georgetown Masters (Nashville, Tennessee)
 Barbara Behler – production assistant 
 Mary Hamilton – art direction 
 Bill Brunt Designs – design 
 Jim "Señor" McGuire – photography
 Charlie McCallen – hand tinting 
 Cheryl Riddle – hair stylist, make-up
 Trish Townsend – wardrobe stylist

Charts

Weekly charts

Year-end charts

Singles

Certifications

References

1992 albums
RCA Records albums
Alabama (American band) albums
Albums produced by Josh Leo